Unmanned: America's Drone Wars is a feature-length documentary film released by Robert Greenwald and Brave New Films in October, 2013, investigating the impact of U.S. drone strikes in Pakistan and elsewhere.

Synopsis 

The film highlights the stories of 16-year-old Tariq Aziz, killed by a drone in 2011; and school teacher, Rafiq ur Rehman, whose mother was killed and children hospitalized due to a drone strike in 2012.
Unmanned includes more than seventy interviews. Prominent among these are a former American drone operator; Pakistani families of drone victims who are seeking legal redress; high ranking politicians and some of the military’s top brass, warning against blowback from the loss of innocent life.
With the intent of humanizing those who have been impacted by US drone policy, Unmanned intersperses these interviews with never-before-seen footage from tribal regions in Pakistan.
The film claims that covert military drone strikes are often imprecise, and result in creating more enemies for the American people, who have little knowledge of how drone victims are targeted and killed.

Release

Unmanned premiered theatrically in New York City on October 30, 2013. In keeping with Brave New Films' unique distribution model, it was also made available online for free.

Congressional briefing

In anticipation of the release, and for the first time ever, Brave New Films and Reprieve brought survivors of US drone strikes to Capitol Hill to testify at a Congressional briefing.

Reception
The initial response to Unmanned was positive. Michael Moore's website said, "It should be required viewing in all schools and homes in the United States."  The Front Page Online calls it "ardently compelling."

Interviewees

Interviewees include:
Lawrence Wilkerson, former chief of staff to Secretary of State Colin Powell
David Kilcullen, former advisor to NATO and to General David Petraeus
Medea Benjamin, co-founder, Code Pink
Jemima Khan, associate editor, New Statesman 
Imran Khan, chair of the Pakistan Tehreek-e-Insaf
Clive Stafford Smith, founder of Reprieve
Pratap Chatterjee, investigative journalist
Andrew Bacevich, professor of international relations and history at Boston University
Mark Mazzetti, national security correspondent, The New York Times and author, The Way of the Knife
Scott Shane, national security reporter, The New York Times
Glenn Greenwald, national security columnist, The Guardian
Karen DeYoung, senior national security correspondent, The Washington Post 
USAF Col. Morris Davis (Ret.), former lead prosecutor For Guantanamo Bay
David D. Cole, professor, Georgetown University Law
Angelo Cardona, founder of Youth Against NATO
James Cavallaro, Stanford Law professor
Akbar Ahmed, former Pakistani ambassador to the UK, and chair of Islamic studies at American University
Pir Zubair Shah, Council on Foreign Relations (Former)
Philip Alston, United Nations, former special rapporteur on extrajudicial executions
23 more scholars, journalists, lawyers, public figures and activists
Dozens of Pakistani survivors of drone strikes, and family members of those who did not survive

See also 

 List of films featuring drones

References

External links 

2013 films
Drone strikes conducted by the United States
Films directed by Robert Greenwald